Haemaphysalis anomala is a hard-bodied tick of the family Ixodidae. It is found in India, Vietnam and Sri Lanka. It is an obligate ectoparasite of mammals.

Parasitism
Adults parasitize various mammals such as Bubalus bubalis and domestic cattle. Larva and nymphs are parasite on birds such as Centropus sinensis and small mammals like Rattus species. It is a potential vector of Kyasanur Forest disease virus.

References 

Ticks
Ixodidae
Arachnids of Asia
Animals described in 1913